Vrandečić is a Croatian surname. The name is known only to originate from Pučišća on the island of Brač. The oldest mention of the name is from 1674. The meaning of the name is not entirely clear. The most likely explanation is that it comes from the first name Vrandeka, Vrane, Frane (but the change from an F to a V is unusual).

People with the name include:
Denny Vrandečić (born 1978), Croatian-American computer scientist
Ivo Vrandečić, (born 1927), Croatian politician and businessman, former president of the Federal Assembly of Yugoslavia and director of Jadranbrod
Vesna Vrandečić, Croatian singer, member of the band Xenia

References

Croatian surnames